The 2010 Chinese Super League season was the seventh season since the establishment of the Chinese Super League, the seventeenth season of a professional association football league and the 49th top-tier league season in China.

The teams ranked first through fourteenth of the 2009 season and two promoted teams from the 2009 League One season participated in this season. Shandong Luneng won the title for third time in seven years.

Promotion and relegation 
Teams promoted from 2009 China League One
 Liaoning Whowin
 Nanchang Hengyuan

Teams relegated to 2010 China League One
 Chengdu Blades
 Guangzhou GPC

Clubs

Clubs & locations 

 P – Promoted, TH – Title Holders

Managerial changes

Foreign Players

Matchfixing scandal 
In China's attempts to revitalise the domestic game, which has been dogged with allegations of corruption over the last few years they questioned or arrested several high-profile members within Chinese football. The most high profile of these were the former Head of the Chinese Football Association Nan Yong, his deputy Yang Yimin and Zhang Jianqiang who used to be in charge of referee arrangements. The crackdown quickly discovered that Guangzhou F.C. and Chengdu Blades had both bribed their way into the top tier. Both were relegated to the second tier and did not appeal, making their punishment the harshest dealt out to a club. In keeping the top table at 16 teams Hangzhou Greentown and Chongqing Lifan both retained their places within the top tier despite being originally slated for relegation.

League table

Positions by round

Results

Goalscorers 
Updated to games played on 6 November 2010.

Top scorers

Awards 
 Chinese Football Association Footballer of the Year:  Duvier Riascos (Shanghai Shenhua)
 Chinese Super League Golden Boot Winner:  Duvier Riascos (Shanghai Shenhua)
 Chinese Football Association Young Player of the Year:  Zheng Zheng (Shandong Luneng Taishan)
 Chinese Football Association Manager of the Year:  Branko Ivanković (Shandong Luneng Taishan)
 Chinese Football Association Referee of the Year:  Sun Baojie
 Chinese Super League Fair Play Award: Nanchang Hengyuan, Jiangsu Sainty, Tianjin Teda

References

External links 
 Chinese Super League official site 

Chinese Super League seasons
1
China
China